The McCormack Ministry was a ministry of the Government of Queensland and was led by Labor Premier William McCormack. It succeeded the Gillies Ministry on 22 October 1925. The ministry was followed by the Moore Ministry on 21 May 1929 after the government were defeated by the Country and Progressive National Party at the 1929 state election ten days earlier.

On 22 October 1925, the Lieutenant-Governor designated 10 principal executive offices of the Government, and appointed the following Members of the Legislative Assembly of Queensland to the Ministry as follows:

 Gledson was a minister without portfolio until 6 September 1926. The position of Secretary of Labour and Industry remained unfilled until Gledson's accession to it.

References
 
 
 

Queensland ministries
Australian Labor Party ministries in Queensland